William A. Freeman was an American politician. He served as a Democratic member for the 120th district of the Florida House of Representatives.

In 1974, Freeman won the election for the 120th district of the Florida House of Representatives. He succeeded Fred N. Tittle. In 1976, Freeman was succeeded by Joseph B. Allen for the 120th district. After being succeeded by Allen, he became a candidate to serve as sheriff in Monroe County, Florida, in which his opponent was Robert Brown. Freeman previously served as sheriff in the 1950s and 1960s for which he also was a member of the Monroe County Commissioner. He possibly won or lost, according to The Miami Herald.

References 

Place of birth missing
Year of birth missing
Place of death missing
Year of death missing
Democratic Party members of the Florida House of Representatives
Florida sheriffs
American deputy sheriffs
20th-century American politicians